Pavel Zavadil (born 30 April 1978 in Olomouc) is a former Czech football midfielder, preferably playing on the right wing or in the center of the field just behind the striker. He last played for SFC Opava. He has played for Örgryte IS and Öster. Before that, he played for Mjällby AIF the first time, as well as AC Sparta Prague and a short spell in Israeli football. Winner of EF-trophy 2006, Öster IF's supporter club East Fronts awarded to the best player of the season.

Zavadil has made a name mainly through his free kicks and corner kicks.

In 2009 Pavel Zavadil signed a 2-year contract with Örgryte IS.

Zavadil ends his career as a player of SFC Opava and as the oldest player of the Czech First League in his forty-two years.

References

External links
 
 
 

1978 births
Living people
Czech footballers
Czech expatriate footballers
Maccabi Haifa F.C. players
Expatriate footballers in Israel
Örgryte IS players
Östers IF players
FC Baník Ostrava players
AC Sparta Prague players
Aris Thessaloniki F.C. players
Czech First League players
Allsvenskan players
Superettan players
Sportspeople from Olomouc
Expatriate footballers in Sweden
Mjällby AIF players
FK Drnovice players
FC Zbrojovka Brno players
Association football midfielders
SFC Opava players